Deh Chol-e Ka Abdel (also Romanized as Deh Chol-e Kā ʿAbdel) is a village in Rak Rural District, in the Central District of Kohgiluyeh County, Kohgiluyeh and Boyer-Ahmad Province, Iran. At the 2006 census, its population was 62, in 10 families.

References 

Populated places in Kohgiluyeh County